The Church of Saint John (Surp Hovanes), also known as Mastara Church, in Mastara, Armenia dates from the 5th century. It features a variation of the cruciform plan and central cupola'd church. In accordance with its square plan, the four projecting apses, inward-facing circular and outward facing polygonal, offer the requisite supports to hold up the imposing polygonal cupola. The complex church designs are like those in Avan and St. Hripsime Church, Echmiadzin. 

The works of medieval architecture in Mastara include, among others, numerous khachkars.

Gallery

External links 
 Armenian Architectural Studies: Mastara
 Armeniapedia.org: Mastara Church
 Armenica.org: Mastara Church
 Rensselaer Digital Collections: Mastara

Tourist attractions in Aragatsotn Province
Armenian Apostolic churches in Armenia
Oriental Orthodox congregations established in the 5th century
Churches in Aragatsotn Province
5th-century churches